Ingo Neumüller (born 30 March 1979) is an Austrian tennis coach and former professional player.
 
Born in Wels, Neumüller turned professional in 1998 and won the 2003 Austrian national championships, which earned him a wilcard to that year's Austrian Open. He lost in the first round of the Austrian Open to Paul-Henri Mathieu in what would be the only ATP Tour main draw appearance of his career.

Neumüller is a former coach of Jürgen Melzer.

ITF Futures titles

Doubles: (1)

References

External links
 
 

1979 births
Living people
Austrian male tennis players
Austrian tennis coaches
Sportspeople from Upper Austria
People from Wels